Vom Webstuhl zur Weltmacht is a German television series about the Fugger family.

See also
List of German television series

External links
 

Television series set in the 15th century
Television series set in the 16th century
1983 German television series debuts
1983 German television series endings
Czechoslovak television series
German-language television shows
Das Erste original programming